Oleh Teplyi (born 4 August 1981) is a professional Ukrainian football striker who plays for FC Lviv in the Ukrainian Premier League.

External links
Profile on EUFO

1981 births
Living people
Ukrainian footballers
FC Halychyna Drohobych players
FC Sokil Zolochiv players
MFC Mykolaiv players
FC Hazovyk-Skala Stryi players
FC Obolon-Brovar Kyiv players
FC Lviv players
FC Nyva Ternopil players
Association football forwards
Sportspeople from Lviv Oblast